Abbas Hamad (born May 27, 1987), mononymously known as  Bas, is an American rapper. He is signed to J. Cole's Dreamville Records via Interscope Records. His first studio album Last Winter, was released on April 29, 2014, followed by his second studio album, Too High to Riot, which was released on March 4, 2016. Bas' third album, Milky Way, was released on August 24, 2018.

Bas was born in Paris, France, in 1987, to Sudanese parents. At the age of 8, his family moved to New York City. He attended St. Francis Preparatory School in Queens, New York.

Musical career

2011–2013: Career beginnings and mixtapes
In 2011, Bas released his debut mixtape titled Quarter Water Raised Vol. 1. In 2013, his second mixtape was released entitled, Quarter Water Raised Vol. 2.

In 2013, Bas was featured on J. Cole's "New York Times" along with 50 Cent from Cole's album Born Sinner, and then on DJ Khaled's "Hells Kitchen" from Suffering from Success. He then appeared on the Dreamville compilation mixtape Revenge of the Dreamers. That mixtape was released in celebration of Dreamville's partnership with Interscope Records, resulting in Bas being signed to Interscope. Two weeks prior to the release of his debut album Last Winter, Bas released a free EP titled Two Weeks Notice.

2014–2015: Last Winter

Last Winter was released on April 29, 2014, by Dreamville Records/Interscope Records. The album was a conceptual project that touches on the cold days in New York City recording the album. The album was supported by the single "My Nigga Just Made Bail" produced by GP808 and featured guest appearances by J. Cole. Last Winter would debut at 103 on the Billboard 200 with 3,601 copies sold in its first week.

Following its release, Bas went on a 10-city nationwide tour titled after the album. Bas followed his own "Last Winter" tour by going on a 24-city nationwide and international tour with TDE rapper Ab-Soul. In 2015, Bas supported J. Cole on '2014 Forest Hills Drive Tour' alongside Omen, Cozz, Jeremih, YG, and Big Sean.

2016–2017: Too High to Riot

Bas released his second album, Too High to Riot on March 4, 2016. The album also includes guest appearances from his labelmates J. Cole and Cozz, as well as the Hics. The album would debut at 49 on the Billboard 200 chart, selling 10,965 copies in its first week. He also later released a music video for each song on the album. Bas went on tour titled after the album in June 2016 with Cozz and EarthGang. It included 26 cities in North America and 10 cities in Europe. On January 29, 2017, the documentary highlighting the tour was released on Tidal.

2018–present: Milky Way

On April 10, 2018, Bas released the one-off single "Pinball II", featuring Correy C. The first single for his third album "Boca Raton" was released on June 19, and featured ASAP Ferg. On August 22, he released the second single "Tribe" featuring J. Cole. Bas released his third album, Milky Way on August 24, 2018. The album debuted at number 35 on the Billboard 200, selling 13,150 album-equivalent units in the first week. Bas announced a 43-city tour to support the album, which began in November 2018 and concluded in February 2019. In late 2018, Bas announced he was working on an album with frequent collaborators, The Hics, the album is due out late 2021 to early 2022.

Discography

Studio albums

Extended plays

Compilation albums

Mixtapes

Singles

As lead artist

As featured artist

Other charted songs

Guest appearances

Awards and nominations

Notes

References

1987 births
Living people
American people of Sudanese descent
Dreamville Records artists
Interscope Records artists
Musicians from Queens, New York
Rappers from New York City
21st-century American rappers
African-American rappers
21st-century African-American musicians
20th-century African-American people